General elections were held in Saint Helena on 13 October 2021 to elect the 12 members of the Legislative Council. They were the first elections after a March 2021 referendum on changing the governance system of Saint Helena from a committee system to a ministerial system. Following the election, the island's first Chief Minister, Julie Thomas, was elected by members of the Legislative Council on its first session on 25 October.

Electoral system
The 12 seats in the Legislative Council were elected by plurality-at-large voting, with voters allowed to cast up to 12 votes. There are no registered political parties, so all candidates ran as independents.

Results

References

Elections in Saint Helena
Saint Helena
Saint Helena
2021 in Saint Helena
October 2021 events in Africa
Non-partisan elections